Dankovsky District is an administrative and municipal district (raion), one of the eighteen in Lipetsk Oblast, Russia. It is located in the north of the oblast. Its administrative center is the town of Dankov. Population:  40,766 (2002 Census);  The population of Dankov accounts for 59.3% of the district's total population.

See also
Polibino

References

Notes

Sources

Districts of Lipetsk Oblast
